Boneo is a rural locality on the Mornington Peninsula in Melbourne, Victoria, Australia, approximately  south of Melbourne's Central Business District, located within the Shire of Mornington Peninsula local government area. Boneo recorded a population of 314 at the 2021 census.

Boneo is located south of and inland from Rosebud.

History

Boneo Post Office first opened on 1 July 1874 and closed in 1877. It reopened in 1902 and apart for a short recess was open until 1951.

Today

It is dominated by the Boneo Flats, where market gardens and pastures are located. It contains a recreation reserve, community hall and primary school. A market also operates on the third Saturday of every month.

The eastern part of the locality, alongside Main Creek, is part of the Mornington Peninsula National Park called Greens Bush, a native bushland area first set aside for conservation in 1974 and supporting the largest population of eastern grey kangaroos on the Mornington Peninsula. Several walking tracks provide access to the area.

See also
 Shire of Flinders – Boneo was previously within this former local government area.

References

External links
 
 Mornington Peninsula National Park - Greens Bush (Parks Victoria)

Towns in Victoria (Australia)
Mornington Peninsula